Thomas Rabitsch (born 19 November 1956 in Vienna) is an Austrian keyboardist and record producer.

Projects

Musical projects 
 1980: Off the bone, Harri Stojka
 1981: Psychoterror, Drahdiwaberl
 1982: Keine Angst, Hansi Lang
 1982: Ohne Ausweg, Der eiserne Vorhang
 1982: Tight, Harri Stojka
 1982: Mc Ronalds Massaker, Drahdiwaberl
 1983: Werwolfromantik, Drahdiwaberl
 1983: Wer hat hier pfui geschrien, Drahdiwaberl
 1983: DÖF (als Koproduzent), DÖF
 1985: Ich oder Du, Hansi Lang
 1985: Jeannys Rache, Drahdiwaberl
 1990: Reif für den Pepi, Drahdiwaberl
 1990: Swound Vibes, The Moreaus
 1992: Ärger als Deix, Heli Deinboek
 1993: Der Puls, Heli Deinboek
 1994: So war's, i schwör's, Heli Deinboek
 1994: Sperminator, Drahdiwaberl
 1996: Die letzte Ölung, Drahdiwaberl
 1996: Deinboek singt Newman, Heli Deinboek
 1997: Spiele Leben – live, Hansi Lang
 1999: Verdammt wir leben noch, Falco
 2000: Torte statt Worte (als Mitproduzent), Drahdiwaberl
 2001: Prinzessin (Single), Max Schmiedl
 2001: Liebeslaube (Single), Max Schmiedl
 2001: 1-13 (Single), Max Schmiedl
 2001: Neue Heim.at, Various
 2004: L.I.V.E. Donauinsel, Falco
 2004: Welcome To The Slow Club, The Slow Club
 2005: This Is The Slow Club, The Slow Club
 2008: Symphonic, Falco
 2008: Donauinsel Live (Re-Release), Falco
 2008: "House Of Sleep", The Slow Club
 2011: "The Secret Is Love", Nadine Beiler

Further Productions
 ????: Produzent von A.D.
 ????: Wir wollen Alles und mehr, Starmania (Producer)
 ????: Atme tief durch, Vera Böhnisch (Producer)
 1998: Remixes der Band Keilerkopf
 2000: F@lco – A Cyber Show (Musical) (Producer of the CD)
 2000: Remixes of the band Heinz aus Wien
 2001: Diverse Produktionen for Afrodelics
 2002: Sprechen Sie Österreichisch? (Producer)
 2002: Das schaurig schönste Ding der Welt (Producer)
 2002: Stars in Your Eyes (Single), Starmania (Co-Producer)
 2003: Tomorrow's Heroes (Single), Starmaniacs (Producer)
 2003: Just A Little Love For Christmas (Titel), Starmania NG
 2004: Starshine (Titel), Starmania NG (Producer)
 2004: My Bonnie Is Over The Ocean (Kinderlieder-CD) (Producer)
 2005: Deine Hilfe wird gebraucht, Austria for Asia (Producer)
 Executive Producer/Co-Producer of further Starmania CDs
 Producer of Engel, Stern und Schlittenfahrt, Die schönsten Kinderlieder, Advent & Weihnacht in Österreich

Music for theatre
 Saitensprung
 F@lco – A Cyber Show (musical director) Ronacher, Vienna, 1 April 2000 (Regie: Paulus Manker, with participation of André Eisermann, Hansi Lang, Roman Gregory, Georgij Makazaria)
 Alpenkönig und Menschenfreund (Music for the programme of Austrofred)
 Elvis & John, Winterreise, Romeo & Julia, Dschungelbuch, Das weite Land, Blutsbrüder, Broadway-Melodie 1492, Mundo Loco (1982), Fröhliche X-mas, Nazis im Weltraum, Na Sowas, Klanggarten (1983) (space installation, music)

Film score
 Sisters of reality
 Bernhardiner & Katz
 Aktion C+M+B
 Vienna
 Spirello
 Falco – Verdammt, wir leben noch!
 Polly Adler

Awards
 2005: Amadeus Austrian Music Award for Live Donauinsel + Stadthalle Wien in the category "Musik-DVD des Jahres"
 2006: Amadeus Austrian Music Award for This Is The Slow Club in the category "Jazz/Blues/Folk-Album des Jahres national" with The Slow Club

References

External links

 Homepage Thomas Rabitsch Music Production Recording Studios
 Rabitsch interview about Falco
 

Austrian keyboardists
Living people
1956 births